Lucy Mae Bruner Baxley Smith (December 21, 1937 – October 14, 2016) was an American politician who served from 2003 to 2007 as the 28th lieutenant governor of Alabama and from 2009 until 2013 as President of the Alabama Public Service Commission. She was the first woman to hold the state's office of lieutenant governor. In 2006, she was the unsuccessful Democratic nominee for governor. In 2008, Lucy Baxley was elected President of the Alabama Public Service Commission, and was the only Democrat to win statewide that year. Until Democrat Doug Jones's victory over Republican Roy Moore in the 2017 U.S. Senate special election, Baxley had been the most recent Democrat to hold statewide office in Alabama.

Early life
Baxley was born Lucy Mae Bruner in 1937 near rural Pansey, located near the larger city of Dothan in Houston County in southeastern Alabama. Baxley attended Auburn University at Montgomery but did not graduate.

Political career
In 1994, Baxley was elected Alabama State Treasurer, in which capacity she pursued office modernization, including the first personal computers for staffers. She worked for expansion of the Prepaid Affordable College Tuition Program.  In 1998, Baxley was re-elected to that post. In 2002, Baxley defeated Bill Armistead in the election as elected lieutenant governor, having received more votes than either candidate for governor that year.  She also served as a delegate to the 1996 Democratic National Convention, which met in Chicago to renominate the Clinton-Gore ticket, which lost in Alabama.

In 2005, Baxley announced plans to run for governor in 2006. Her main opponent in the primary was former Governor Don Siegelman. In large part because of Siegelman's indictment for bribery and racketeering, she was able to secure important endorsements from the Alabama Democratic Conference, the New South Coalition, and the Alabama State Employees Association.  Despite running a relatively low-profile campaign, she coasted to a win in the primary election on June 6 with 60 percent of the vote. Baxley was an underdog in the general election, however, against incumbent Republican Bob Riley, trailing by as much as 30 points in some polls. Baxley proposed a raise in the minimum wage of $1 per hour, which generated some criticism from her opponents.  She was heavily outspent in the campaign by Riley and pointed to Riley's receipt of large contributions from recipients of industrial development subsidies.  Baxley lost to Riley, 58-42 percent.

Baxley's term as lieutenant governor ended in 2007, and she was succeeded by fellow Democrat and former Governor Jim Folsom, Jr., of Cullman. Making a political comeback in 2008, Baxley defeated Republican Twinkle A. Cavanaugh to become president of the Alabama Public Service Commission. She replaced the retiring Jim Sullivan. She was then defeated by Cavanaugh in 2012 during her bid for reelection.

In each of her campaigns for office, Baxley utilized media bearing the title of the iconic CBS situation comedy starring Lucille Ball, I Love Lucy.

Stroke and recovery
Baxley was admitted to UAB hospital in Birmingham on November 23, 2006, Thanksgiving Day. She had become ill Wednesday evening, while visiting her family in Birmingham.  Doctors kept her for tests and observations. A spokeswoman for UAB announced that Baxley had suffered a mild stroke, but was expected to fully recover. A statement was issued via her family that asked Alabamians to keep Baxley in their prayers. No further details of her condition were given at the time.

She was discharged from UAB on November 29 and then moved to Lakeshore Rehabilitation Center in Birmingham. She remained there until being released December 29.  The cause of Baxley's stroke has not been determined.  Following the advice of her neurologist, Baxley did not return to Montgomery to preside over the opening of the Senate, her last official duty as lieutenant governor.  According to Senator Lowell Barron, a Democrat from Fyffe, "Lucy's situation is serious."  It was difficult for her to move her left leg and "she was unable to move her left arm."  Following her discharge, she underwent outpatient rehabilitation.

Personal life and death
Baxley first married at the age of eighteen; later, she married Bill Baxley, who from 1971 to 1979 was the state attorney general and later from 1983 to 1987 the lieutenant governor. Bill Baxley became involved with another woman in a widely publicized affair, and the couple divorced in 1987.  From 1996 until her death in 2016, Baxley was married to Jim Smith.

A licensed real estate broker, Baxley opened a real estate practice in suburban Birmingham after leaving the office of lieutenant governor in 2007. She died at her home in Birmingham, Alabama on October 14, 2016.

Electoral history
2012 General Election: Alabama Public Service Commission

2008 General Election: Alabama Public Service Commission

2006 General Election: Governor

2006 Democratic Primary: Governor

2002 General Election: Lieutenant Governor

1998 General Election: State Treasurer

1994 General Election: State Treasurer

1994 Democratic Primary: State Treasurer

* = Incumbent

Bold = Winner

Note: All votes are official results from the Alabama Secretary of State website.
Alabama Secretary of State

See also
List of female lieutenant governors in the United States

References

External links

RE/MAX Alabama: Lucy Baxley

|-

|-

|-

|-

1937 births
2016 deaths
Alabama Democrats
American real estate businesspeople
American United Methodists
Auburn University at Montgomery alumni
Businesspeople from Alabama
Lieutenant Governors of Alabama
People from Houston County, Alabama
People from Vestavia Hills, Alabama
State treasurers of Alabama
Women in Alabama politics
20th-century American businesspeople
20th-century Methodists